Giorgio Tinazzi (21 June 1934 – 18 February 2016) was an Italian professional football player.

References

1934 births
2016 deaths
Italian footballers
Serie A players
Inter Milan players
U.S. Alessandria Calcio 1912 players
Hellas Verona F.C. players
Udinese Calcio players
Modena F.C. players
Palermo F.C. players
Casale F.B.C. players

Association football midfielders